Digital motion X-ray

(Digital Motion X-Ray: Non-fluoroscopic)
Conventional radiography is now used for the recording of motion studies.  This method does not employ the use of fluoroscopy that has been the most common use of X-rays but rather uses conventional X-rays.  
The manner of recording a motion study is to couple an X-ray system with a digital computer and a detection system that records images in real time.

Example: The A2D2, Inc. Model 1713 is a digital system that is capable of recording static images or a dynamic sequence.

Static images are recorded in a 5,000 by 4,000 pixel array with 14 bit capacity.  These images are stored in the computer memory for recording and/or playback.  Dynamic studies are recorded in real time at a rate of 30 frames per second with resolution of 1990 by 1200 pixels.  Typically, one second of data recording is required for a complete motion study at 30 frames per second.  Sophisticated software is used to automatically record the study and then to cause it to playback in a bi-directional format.

Patient radiation dose is minimal over the one second time frame.  Typical radiation dose is approximately 2 mSv for this one second period.  Any form of joint motion can be recorded and analyzed.

References

(Motion X-Ray)

1. Bill O'Neill inventor of and leader in non-fluoroscopic digital motion x-ray technology.

(DMX)

1. Hino H, Abumi K, Kanayama M, Kaneda K. Dynamic Motion analysis of normal and unstable cervical spines using cineradiography. An in vivo study. Spine, 1999 Jan 15;24(2): 163–8.

2. Motomochi M, et al., Diagnosis of Abnormal Spine Motion with Cineradiography. No Shinkei Geka. 1978 Nov; 6(11): 1077–82.

3. Ruey-Mo Lin, MD, et al., Characteristics of Sagittal Vertebral Alignment in Flexion Determined by Dynamic Radiographs of the Cervical Spine. Spine, 2001 Vol 26, (3), 256–261.

4. Youhimoto H, et al., Kinematic Evaluation of Atlantoaxial Joint Instability: An In Vivo Cineradiographic Investigation. Journal of Spinal Disorders 14, (1), 21–31.

5. Gavin, T. et al., Biomechanical analysis of cervical orthroses in Flexion: A comparison of cervical collars and Cervicothoracic orthroses. Journal of Rehabilitation Research and Development. Vol 40 (6), Nov/Dec 2003, 527–538.

6. Krakenes J, et al., MRI Assessment of the Alar Ligaments in the Late State of Injury: A Study of Structural Abnormalities and observer Agreement. Neuroradiology. 2002, 44: 617–624.

7. Panjabi M, et al., Injury Mechanisms of the Cervical Intervertebral Disc During Stimulated Whiplash. Spine. 29, No 11, 2004, 1217–1225.

8. Waldman S. et al., Atlanto-Occipital and Atlantoaxial Injections in the Treatment of Headache and Neck Pain. Interventional Pain Management. 1996, W. B. Saunders, pp 219–222.

9. Bogduk, N., Cervicogenic Headache: Anatomic Basis and Pathophysiologic Mechanisms. Curr. Pain Headache Rep. 2001 Aug: 5(4): 382–6.

10. Bogduk N, Yogananandan N, Biomechanics of the Cervical Spine Part 3: Minor Injuries, Clinical Biomechanics, 2001 May; 16(4): 267–75.

11. Mercer S, Bogduk N. The Ligaments and Annulus Fibrosus of Human Adult Cervical Intervertebral Discs. Spine 1999 Apr 1; 24(7): 619–26.

12. Bogduk N, Lord SM. Cervical Spine Disorders. Curr Opin Rheumatol. 1998 Mar: 10(2): 110–5.

13. Wallis BJ, et al., The Psychological Profiles of Patients with Whiplash-Associated Headache. Cephalgia. 1998 Oct; 18(2):101-5.

14. Lord SM, et al., Chronic Cervical Zygapophyseal Joint Pain After Whiplash. A placebo-controlled Prevalence Study. Spine. 1996 Aug 1; 21(15): 1737–44.

15. Cocchiarella L, et al., American Medical Association Guides to the Evaluation of Permanent Impairment. Fifth Edition. 15.6 DRE Cervical Spine, 15.6a Criteria For Rating Impairment Due to Cervical Disorders.

16. Greenman P, Principals of Manual Medicine, Williams and Wilkins, 1996 Chapter 13: The Cervical Spine, 175–204.

17. Netter F, The CIBA Collection of Medial Illustrations, Vol 8, Part 1, pp 10–13.

18. Occupational Medicine Practice Guide-lines, Second Edition, American College of Occupational and Environmental Medicine, 2004, Chapter 8.

19. Weiner RS, Pain Management: A Practical Guide for Clinicians, Sixth Edition, DC Press, 2001. pp 395–396.

20. Dwyer A., et al., Cervical Zyagopophyseal Joint Pain Patterns. II: A Study in Normal Volunteers, Spine 15: 453–447, 1990.

21. Bogduk N, Marsland A: The Cervical Zygapophyseal Joints As a Source of Neck Pain. Spine 13: 610–617, 1988.

22. National Guideline Clearing House (NGC), [2]. Search video fluoroscopy, Select: vertebral subluxation in Chiropractic Practice, Council on Chiropractic Practice - Private Nonprofit Organization. 1998 (revised 2003). 201 pages. NGC:003438.

X-ray instrumentation